Soru may refer to:
 Renato Soru, an Italian internet entrepreneur
 Sõru, village in Hiiumaa Parish, Hiiu County, Estonia
 Soru, Azerbaijan, municipality in Lerik District, Azerbaijan
 Soru, Nepal, rural municipality in Karnali province, Nepal

See also
 Ab Soru, a village in Iran
 Saru Castles
 Sors, Azerbaijan